Daniel Semenzato (born 11 January 1987) is an Italian footballer who plays as a defender for  club Viterbese.

Club career

Internazionale
Born in Montebelluna, Veneto, Semenzato started his career at Internazionale, as first as a midfielder, played from Giovanissimi Nazionali team to the top team of the youth rank – Primavera (from 2004 to 2006). He also played for the first team in friendlies in 2004–05, 2005–06 season and 2006–07 season.

Lega Pro clubs
On 31 August 2006, he was sold to Serie C2 club Montichiari in co-ownership deal. He was the regular of the team, however he was on the bench in relegation play-out against PortoSummaga, and replacing right back Paolo Zaccagnini in the return leg. Montichiari relegated to Serie D that season.

In June 2007, he was bought back by Internazionale. and re-sold to PortoSummaga. Inter also bought Montichiari team-mate Marco Filippini from the relegated side. Semenzato only made 1 league appearance for the promotion playoffs winner.

In July 2008, he left for Lega Pro Prima Divisione (ex-Serie C1) club Venezia. He often played as the starting XI, but again put on the bench in relegation playout. He played 90 minutes in the return leg, this time Venezia survived from the play-out but expelled from professional league due to bankrupt in July.

Frosinone
In July 2009, he was signed by Serie B club Frosinone as free agent. He made his club debut on 15 August 2009, the second match of the season and of the Cup. He was the starting right back in that narrowly win Serie A club Bologna by penalty shootout. But in the next match, he lost the starting place to Lorenzo Del Prete on 21 August, the opening match of Frosinone in Serie B. Semenzato replaced left midfielder Simone Basso in the 81st minute on that match. That match Frosinone winning Salernitana 2–1. He waited until round 5 to play his first match as starter, due to Del Prete was unavailable in the last minute. He started again in round 13 (7 November 2009) against Gallipoli due to Del Prete's fitness and again in round 15 (28 November 2009), and from round 21 (9 January 2010) to round 23 (23 January) Coach Francesco Moriero also used Nicholas Guidi as emergency right back but soon used Semenzato since round 21. After left back Antonio Bocchetti was unavailable in round 25, he changed to play as an emergency left back and replaced suspended Del Prete in the next round. Semenzato ahead healthy Del Prete as right back from round 32 to 36 (missed round 35). Since round 37, Moriero took Del Prete back to starting XI and new coach Guido Carboni resumed the same line-up for the relegation threatening team. He started his 13th in Serie B and the last one with Frosinone on 15 May (round 40), to replace the unavailable Del Prete. then the coach used Guidi as emergency right back again. Frosinone finished as the 16th that season, just 2 points above the teams that had to play relegation playout.

Cittadella
In August 2010, he was sold to fellow Serie B team Cittadella. He was the understudy of Andrea Manucci but started as emergency right back at the first match of the season (also the first match in the cup). In the next match, the opening match of Cittadella in Serie B, coach Claudio Foscarini used Gianluca Nocentini as right back instead.

On 31 January 2011, Semenzato was signed by Como.

Return to Serie C
In June 2011 he was exchanged with Ferdinando Vitofrancesco of U.S. Cremonese. In October 2012 he joined U.S. Lecce and moved to Treviso in January 2013.

In summer 2013 Semenzato played for Vicenza Calcio as a trialist.

On 30 August 2013 he was signed by Bassano Virtus 55 Soccer Team. His contract was renewed on 23 May 2014.

In the summer of 2016 he moved to Pordenone. On 11 July 2017 he signed a two-year contract with Catania. He returned to Pordenone on 17 July 2018.

On 29 September 2020 he signed a two-year contract with Bari.

On 20 January 2022 he moved to Viterbese.

International career
Semenzato capped for Azzurrini in under-17 and under-19 level. He played for U17 team at 2004 UEFA European Under-17 Football Championship qualification (2 games) and in the elite round (2 games). For U19 team, he capped once at 2006 UEFA European Under-19 Football Championship qualification (called-up along with team-mate Giacomo Bindi and Matteo Momentè). That match Italy would qualify if winning Republic of Ireland, and Semenzato ahead Alessio Cerci as starter. Semenzato was replaced by Cerci in the 30th minute and Cerci scored the only goal for Azzurrini, eventually Italy lost 1–4 and failed to qualify to the elite round.

Honours
Inter Primavera
Coppa Italia Primavera: 2006

References

External links
 La Gazzetta dello Sport Profile 
 Football.it Profile 
 
 
 FIGC 

1987 births
Living people
People from Montebelluna
Italian footballers
Association football fullbacks
Serie B players
Serie C players
Inter Milan players
A.C. Montichiari players
A.S.D. Portogruaro players
Venezia F.C. players
Frosinone Calcio players
A.S. Cittadella players
Como 1907 players
U.S. Cremonese players
U.S. Lecce players
Treviso F.B.C. 1993 players
Bassano Virtus 55 S.T. players
Pordenone Calcio players
Catania S.S.D. players
S.S.C. Bari players
U.S. Viterbese 1908 players
Italy youth international footballers
Sportspeople from the Province of Treviso
Footballers from Veneto